Beatriz Elena Uribe Botero is a Colombian economist and politician currently serving as the 1st President of the National Mining Agency Colombia.

Career

Ministry of Housing
Uribe has worked as President of the Colombian Chamber of Construction (Camacol), served as Deputy Minister of Housing during President Álvaro Uribe Vélez's first term in office. On 7 August 2010, the newly elected President, Juan Manuel Santos Calderón appointed her to serve as the 5th Minister of Environment, Housing and Territorial Development. During her time in the Ministry she oversaw the restructuring of the Ministry separating the housing and territory portfolios from that of environment, thus creating two separate ministries in the cabinet. On 27 September 2011 Uribe was reappointed as the 1st Minister of Housing, City and Territory, serving until 17 May 2012 when she was replaced by Germán Vargas Lleras.

Personal life
Uribe was born in Pereira, Risaralda. She has two sons, Camilo and Santiago.

References

Year of birth missing (living people)
People from Pereira, Colombia
Living people
Del Rosario University alumni
Alumni of the London School of Economics
Colombian economists
Ministers of Environment, Housing and Territorial Development of Colombia
Ministers of Housing, City and Territory of Colombia
Women government ministers of Colombia
21st-century Colombian women politicians
21st-century Colombian politicians